David Wheadon is a former Australian rules footballer who played with Collingwood in the Victorian Football League (VFL).

References

External links 

1948 births
Australian rules footballers from Victoria (Australia)
Collingwood Football Club players
Colac Football Club players
Living people